Nürtingen is an electoral constituency (German: Wahlkreis) represented in the Bundestag. It elects one member via first-past-the-post voting. Under the current constituency numbering system, it is designated as constituency 262. It is located in central Baden-Württemberg, comprising the southern part of the Esslingen district.

Nürtingen was created for the 1965 federal election. Since 2002, it has been represented by Michael Hennrich of the Christian Democratic Union (CDU).

Geography
Nürtingen is located in central Baden-Württemberg. As of the 2021 federal election, it comprises entirety of the Esslingen district excluding the municipalities of Aichwald, Altbach, Baltmannsweiler, Deizisau, Denkendorf, Esslingen am Neckar, Hochdorf, Köngen, Lichtenwald, Neuhausen auf den Fildern, Ostfildern, Plochingen, Reichenbach an der Fils, Wendlingen am Neckar, and Wernau. It also contains the municipalities of Steinenbronn and Waldenbuch from the Böblingen district.

History
Nürtingen was created in 1965, then known as Nürtingen – Böblingen. It acquired its current name in the 1980 election. In the 1965 through 1976 elections, it was constituency 170 in the numbering system. In the 1980 through 1998 elections, it was number 166. In the 2002 and 2005 elections, it was number 263. Since the 2009 election, it has been number 262.

Originally, the constituency comprised the Nürtingen district and the Böblingen district excluding the municipalities of Dätzingen, Döffingen, Magstadt, and Sindelfingen. In the 1976 election, it gained the municipalities of Dätzingen and Döffingen while losing the municipalities of Böblingen, Grafenau, Leonberg, Renningen, Rutesheim, Weil der Stadt, and Weissach. In the 1980 election, it acquired a configuration very similar to its current borders, but excluding the municipalities of Steinenbronn und Waldenbuch from the Böblingen district. It acquired its current borders in the 2005 election.

Members
The constituency has been held continuously by the Christian Democrat Union (CDU) since its creation. It was first represented by Anton Stark from 1965 to 1990, a total of seven consecutive terms. Elmar Müller was representative from 1990 to 2002. Michael Hennrich has been representative since 2002.

Election results

2021 election

2017 election

2013 election

2009 election

References

Federal electoral districts in Baden-Württemberg
1965 establishments in West Germany
Constituencies established in 1965
Esslingen (district)